Tang-e Bagh or Tang Bagh may refer to:
 Tang-e Bagh, Hormozgan
 Tang Bagh, Kurdistan